The Hawtai Shengdafei is a compact crossover sport utility vehicle (CUV) produced by the Chinese manufacturer Hawtai since 2009. It is named to sound similar to the Chinese name of the Hyundai Santa Fe.

First generation (2009-2015)

Hawtai Motor manufactured the first-generation Hyundai Santa Fe starting from 2006 which is part of a joint venture that began in 2002. One of the versions Hawtai debuted under its own brand name in 2009 was the Shengdafei or Santa Fe C9. Utilizing a Rover-acquired engine, it may have been priced at a significant discount to those bearing the Hyundai name.

Hyundai ended its partnership with Hawtai in 2010 and production of the first generation Shengdafei ended in 2015.

Second generation

The second generation Hawtai Shengdafei debuted during the 2014 Beijing Auto Show. Previously known as the Hawtai A25, the Hawtai Shengdafei was positioned under the Hawtai Baolige. Transmission options include a 5-speed manual gearbox and a 4-speed automatic gearbox.

A facelift for the second generation Hawtai Shengdafei was introduced during the 2017 Shanghai Auto Show slightly updating the exterior and interior of the model. As of August 2017, the model was launched as the Hawtai Shengdafei 5, with the original Hawtai Shengdafei name being transformed into a whole series of products.

The Hawtai Shengdafei 5 also spawned electric variants including the Hawtai Shengdafei 5XEV 260 and Hawtai Shengdafei 5XEV 480 featuring blue accents that differentiates from the internal combustion engine version.

References

External links
 (Hawtai Shengdafei 5)
 (Hawtai Shengdafei 5XEV 260)
 (Hawtai Shengdafei 5XEV 480)

2010s cars
All-wheel-drive vehicles
Cars introduced in 2009
Crossover sport utility vehicles
Front-wheel-drive vehicles
Compact sport utility vehicles
Cars of China